4-Aminodiphenylamine is a diphenylamine with an additional amine substituent. This dimer of aniline has various industrial uses, including as a hair dye ingredient, but also has raised concerns about toxicity by skin contact. It is also a starting material for the synthesis of 6PPD, an antiozonant for various rubber products. A colorimetric test for the quantitative analysis of nitrite, at levels below 100 nanograms per milliliter, is based on nitrite-catalyzed coupling of 4-aminodiphenylamine with N,N-dimethylaniline.

The most common route of industrial production is by the reaction of aniline with 4‑nitrochlorobenzene followed by reduction of the intermediate 4‑nitrodiphenylamine. An alternative is the direct condensation reaction of nitrobenzene with aniline via a nucleophilic aromatic substitution of hydrogen, this again requires a reduction step.

References 

Anilines